The 1969 Kangaroo Tour of New Zealand was a mid-season tour of New Zealand by the Australia national rugby league team. The Australians played six matches on tour, including two tests against the New Zealand national rugby league team. The tour began on 28 May and finished on 10 June.

Leadership 
Harry Bath coached the Kangaroos side throughout the tour. South Sydney's John Sattler captained the side. In the two matches in which Sattler did not play, the team was captained by Les Johns (against Wellington) and John McDonald against Auckland. The touring team was co-managed by Eddie Burns (Canterbury, NSW) and Jack Lynch (Ipswich, Qld).

Touring squad 
The Rugby League News published details of the touring team including the players' ages and weights. A team photo was published during the tour. 
Match details - listing surnames of both teams and the point scorers - were included in E.E. Christensen's Official Rugby League Yearbook, as was a summary of the players' point-scoring. 
Denman, Fitzsimmons, Manteit, Robson and Weiss were selected from Queensland clubs. Cootes, Costello and Lye were selected from clubs in New South Wales Country areas. The balance of the squad were playing for Sydney based clubs during the 1969 season.

Tour 
The Australians played six matches on the tour, winning the first four before losing the final two.

First test

Second test

References 

Australia national rugby league team tours
Rugby league tours of New Zealand
Kangaroo tour of New Zealand
Kangaroo tour of New Zealand